The Kaohsiung Vision Museum is a museum in Sanmin District, Kaohsiung, Taiwan.

History
The museum building was constructed in 1941 in the Imperial Crown Style by Shimizu Corporation and served as the Kaohsiung Main Station building until 2002.

Transportation
The museum is accessible within walking distance southeast of Kaohsiung Station.

See also
 List of museums in Taiwan

References

External links

 

1941 establishments in Taiwan
Defunct railway stations in Taiwan
Imperial Crown Style architecture
Museums in Kaohsiung
Railway stations opened in 1941
Repurposed railway stations